Ermoshikha is a rural locality (a selo) and the administrative center of Ermoshikhinsky Selsoviet of Loktevsky District, Altai Krai, Russia. The population was 150 as of 2016. There are 5 streets.

Geography 
Ermoshikha is located 32 km south of Gornyak (the district's administrative centre) by road. Gorkunovo is the nearest rural locality.

References 

Rural localities in Loktevsky District